Statistics and Computing is a peer-reviewed academic journal that deals with statistics and computing. It was established in 1991 and is published by Springer.

External links 
 

 

Mathematics journals
Publications established in 1991
Statistics journals
Computer science journals
Springer Science+Business Media academic journals